Farang wa Gharu or Firing wa Gharu is a district in Baghlan province, Afghanistan. It was created in 2005 from part of Khost wa Fereng District.

References

Districts of Baghlan Province